Gokaraju Ganga Raju is an Indian politician and a Member of Parliament to the 16th Lok Sabha from Narsapuram (Lok Sabha constituency), Andhra Pradesh. He won the 2014 Indian general election being a Bharatiya Janata Party candidate. He is also the founder of Laila Group of Companies. Recently, he was elected as Vice-President to Board of Control for Cricket in India (BCCI) South Zone.

His father, Late Sri Gokaraju Ranga Raju, served as an MLA from Undi constituency, ZP Vice Chairman of West Godavari District and also served Lord Balaji as the Chairman of  Board of trustees, TTD, twice.

Dr Ganga Raju is the Secretary of Andhra Cricket Association, Chairman of Financial Committee of BCCI and also the Member of Governing Council of Indian Premier League run by BCCI. Recently, Raju was elected as Vice-President to Board of Control for Cricket in India(BCCI).

References

Living people
India MPs 2014–2019
Lok Sabha members from Andhra Pradesh
People from West Godavari district
Bharatiya Janata Party politicians from Andhra Pradesh
Indian cricket administrators
1949 births